Languages of Yugoslavia are all languages languages spoken in former Yugoslavia. They are mainly Indo-European languages and dialects, namely dominant South Slavic varieties (Serbo-Croatian, Macedonian, and Slovene) as well as Albanian, Aromanian, Czech, German, Italian, Venetian, Balkan Romani, Romanian, Rusyn, Slovak and Ukrainian languages. There are also pockets where non-Indo-European languages such as Hungarian, Turkish, etc.  varieties are spoken.

Language policies in Yugoslavia 
From 1966, linguistic and ethnic divisions were part of the public discussion in Yugoslavia. Language policies were delegated to the communal level. Language situation was reflected in each republic's constitution, and more detailed in communal constitutions.

Yugoslavia established its language policies at a federal, republic, and communal level.

Federal language policy was drafted by the following four principles:

 Domestic measures were the basis of language policy.
 Special measures were required. Guaranteeing "equal rights" for all ethnic groups was insufficient.
 Integration of all nations and nationalities depends upon the ability of the politico-administrative structure to provide mechanisms of expression.
 Each nation and nationality should have a direct voice in determining specific measures.

List of languages in Yugoslavia 
This is a list of the languages of the former country of Yugoslavia:

Official languages
Serbo-Croatian, pluricentric language and dialect continuum of Bosnia and Herzegovina, Croatia, Montenegro and Serbia, split into four national standard varieties used in respective countries after the breakup of Yugoslavia: Bosnian, Croatian, Montenegrin and Serbian.
Slovene language, language of Slovenia
Macedonian language, language of North Macedonia (previously Macedonia)

Minority languages

Various minority had official usage at various sub-federal levels:

 In SAP Vojvodina, there were four minority languages in official use:
 Hungarian;
 Romanian;
 Rusyn;
 Slovak.

 In SAP Kosovo, Albanian was used in official use.

 At a municipal level, following languages were in official use:
 Albanian, in parts of SR Macedonia and SR Montenegro;
 Bulgarian, in parts of SR Serbia;
 Czech, in parts of SAP Vojvodina and SR Croatia;
 German, in parts of SR Croatia and SR Slovenia;
 Hungarian, in parts of SR Slovenia and SR Croatia;
 Italian, in parts of SR Slovenia and SR Croatia;
 Rusyn, in parts of SR Croatia;
 Turkish, in parts of SAP Kosovo and SR Macedonia;
 Ukrainian, in parts of SR Croatia.

 Following minority languages were spoken, but didn't have any official use:
 Balkan Gagauz Turkish, spoken by Turkish people in SAP Kosovo and SR Macedonia;
 Romani, throughout the country;
 Vlach, in parts of SR Serbia.

See also 

Yugoslav Sign Language, a deaf sign language based on Serbo-Croatian
Languages of the Soviet Union

References 

Yugoslav culture
Language policy in Bosnia and Herzegovina, Croatia, Montenegro and Serbia
Languages of North Macedonia
Languages of Slovenia